Snowmass is a ski resort located in the Town of Snowmass Village near Aspen, Colorado.   The ski area is owned and operated by the Aspen Skiing Company as part of the  Aspen/Snowmass complex. It was opened on December 17, 1967
. Snowmass is the largest of the four Aspen/Snowmass mountains, comprising .

Slopes 
The mountain is most notable for its wide cruiser runs, family-friendly atmosphere, and extensive ski-in/ski-out lodging. Despite its family reputation, the resort also contains several terrain parks, extensive extreme skiing terrain, mogul runs, and gladed terrain.

Changes 
Snowmass has undergone massive changes in the past few years, including a new gondola and a new Base Village.  Snowmass has also constructed a new restaurant near Elk Camp, replacing Cafe Suzanne with a large, brand-new restaurant. Today, Snowmass continues its extensive improvements to on-mountain infrastructure and lift repairs.

Lifts 
Snowmass has the most vertical feet of skiing of any ski area in the United States, but only when the Cirque poma is running.  There are 17 lifts at Snowmass: 7 high-speed quads (Two Creeks, Elk Camp, Alpine Springs, Sheer Bliss, Coney Glade, Sam's Knob, High Alpine), two high-speed six packs (Village Express, Big Burn), two gondolas (the Sky Cab - better known as the "Skittles" and Elk Camp Gondola), two quads (Meadows and Assay Hill), 1 double (Campground) and two pull lifts (Scooper and The Cirque).

References

External links
Official site
Aspen Ski & Snow Report

Buildings and structures in Pitkin County, Colorado
Ski areas and resorts in Colorado
Roaring Fork Valley
Aspen Skiing Company
Tourist attractions in Pitkin County, Colorado
White River National Forest